Granvanoeli is the third album of the Italian alternative rock band Meganoidi.

Track listing
 At Dusk - 5:21
 The Millstone - 3:50
 Dai pozzi - 3:09
 Anche senza bere - 3:35
 02:16 - 4:38
 Quest'inverno - 5:22
 Ten Black Rivers - 2:54
 Nine Times Out of Ten - 3:09
 Un approdo - 4:21
 Granvanoeli - 2:11

References

2006 albums
Meganoidi albums